Chiclín is a town in Northern Peru in Chicama District of Ascope Province in the region La Libertad. This town is located beside the Pan-American Highway some 35 km north of Trujillo city in the agricultural Chicama Valley.

See also
Ascope Province
Chavimochic
Virú Valley
Virú
Moche valley

External links
Location of Chiclín by Wikimapia

References

Populated places in La Libertad Region